Lloyd James Waner (March 16, 1906 – July 22, 1982), nicknamed "Little Poison", was a Major League Baseball (MLB) center fielder. Along with his brother, Paul Waner, he anchored the Pittsburgh Pirates outfield throughout the 1920s and 1930s. After brief stints with four other teams late in his career, Waner retired as a Pirate.

Waner finished with a batting average over .300 in ten seasons. He earned a selection to the MLB All-Star Game in 1938. Lloyd and Paul Waner set the record for career hits by brothers in MLB. He was elected into the National Baseball Hall of Fame by the Veterans Committee in 1967. He worked as a scout for the Pirates and the Baltimore Orioles after retiring as a player.

Early life
Waner was born on March 16, 1906, in Harrah, Oklahoma, and grew up on a farm with his older brother, Paul. The two worked from dawn to dusk every day, and baseball was their only form of entertainment. Influenced by their father, who was a minor league player in Oklahoma City, Paul and Lloyd's love and natural talent for the game developed over the years. The Waners learned to hit against corncobs and cut down saplings in the woods to use as bats. Lloyd graduated from McLoud High School and attended three semesters at East Central State University in Ada, Oklahoma before going into professional baseball.

Waner started his professional baseball career in 1925 with the San Francisco Seals of the Pacific Coast League, but he hit poorly. He was offered a tryout for the Pirates at the urging of his brother, who had been discovered in Ada by Pirates scout Joe Devine. In 1926, he batted .345 in the Class B South Atlantic League. He also won the league's most valuable player award.

MLB career

Early career
Waner broke into the major leagues with the Pirates in 1927 and quickly built his reputation as a slap hitter with an astute sense of plate discipline. In his rookie campaign, he batted .355 with 223 hits while only striking out 23 times (the highest strikeout total of his career). As the leadoff hitter of the powerful Pittsburgh offense, he led the National League (NL) with 133 runs scored. The runs scored mark set an MLB rookie record. Al López said that infielders of the era played deep at their positions, but Waner made them play closer to compensate for his speed as a runner.

The Pirates won the 1927 NL pennant; Waner then batted .400 in his only World Series, but the New York Yankees won in four games. He continued to bat well early in his career. He earned a record-setting 678 hits over his first three seasons (1927–1929). (From 2001 to 2003, Ichiro Suzuki came close to the mark with 662 hits in his first three years.) Waner finished in the top ten in MVP voting 1927 and 1929.

Coming off a .353 season in 1929, he missed most of the next year due to appendicitis. He had surgery for the condition in the winter. Waner had difficulty recovering from the surgery and re-entered the hospital in May. The Pittsburgh Press reported the fear that he might have to retire.

Middle career
He returned in 1931 and led the NL with 214 hits and 681 at-bats while hitting .314. Waner hit .333 the next year and finished 13th in MVP voting, but his average dropped to .276 in 1933. Waner's average increased to .283 and then .309 over the next two years, though he did not lead the league in any offensive categories or place in the MVP voting during those seasons. In January 1936, Waner became ill with pneumonia and his condition was initially said to be critical. He recovered and was back on the field by late April. Waner hit between .313 and .330 between 1936 and 1938, earning an MLB All-Star Game selection in 1938.

Later career
After splitting time in the early 1940s with the Boston Braves, Cincinnati Reds, Philadelphia Phillies, and Brooklyn Dodgers, Waner returned to Pittsburgh, where he finished his career. In September 1945, he asked team president William Benswanger for his release, saying, "The old legs just won't hold up anymore and I'm convinced that I'm through." He compiled a career .316 batting average, batting .300 or higher in ten seasons. Waner was also an accomplished center fielder. He led the league in putouts four times, using his excellent speed to cover the spacious Forbes Field outfield. He recorded a career .983 fielding percentage at that position.

He (2,459) and his older brother Paul (3,152) hold the career record for hits by brothers (5,611), outpacing the three Alou brothers and the three DiMaggio brothers, among others. For most of the period from 1927 to 1940, Paul patrolled right field at Forbes Field while Lloyd covered the ground next to him in center.  On September 15, 1938, the brothers hit back-to-back home runs against Cliff Melton of the New York Giants.

Paul was known as "Big Poison" and Lloyd as "Little Poison". They got their nicknames from a Brooklyn Dodgers fan's pronunciation of "Big Person" and "Little Person", which was then picked up by a sportswriter in the stands. In 1927, the season the brothers accumulated 460 hits, the fan is said to have remarked, "Them Waners! It's always the little poison on thoid (third) and the big poison on foist (first)!"

Later life

After retiring as a player, Waner was a scout for Pittsburgh from 1946 to 1949. He filled the same role with the Baltimore Orioles in 1955. He worked for the city of Oklahoma City between 1950 and 1967. Lloyd and Paul Waner both struggled with alcohol abuse. Lloyd Waner Jr. said that while Paul "drank like a fish when he was playing ball", Lloyd's drinking intensified after his playing career was over. Lloyd Jr. said that the brothers would have been better known and would have enjoyed their later lives more were it not for alcohol.

In 1950, Lloyd and Paul Waner lost their older brother, Ralph Waner, when he was fatally shot by his ex-wife Marie. Ralph had been eating a steak dinner with his girlfriend when Marie came into the restaurant. Ralph and Marie both became angry. As they started to walk outside, Marie pulled out a gun. Ralph was shot twice, then struggled for the weapon. It went off one more time, injuring Marie. Ralph died a short time later. Ralph had held numerous roles in organized baseball in Pennsylvania.

Waner was inducted into the National Baseball Hall of Fame in 1967. Sabermetrician Bill James has listed Waner as one of ten examples of Hall of Fame inductees who do not deserve the honor. Possible reasons for his selection include his brother being a fellow inductee and the inflated batting averages of his era, which helped many players from the 1920s and 1930s in the eyes of the Veterans Committee.

Late in Waner's life, writer Donald Honig asked him about a previous quote in which Waner said that he would have played baseball for free. "I think I would have asked for expenses", Waner reflected.   Lloyd gave up drinking in the last four or five years of his life and Lloyd Jr. said that "it was like having a real father around... I'll always treasure that period." In 1982, Waner died of complications related to emphysema. He was survived by his wife Frances and his two children.

See also
 List of Major League Baseball career hits leaders
 List of Major League Baseball career runs scored leaders
 List of Major League Baseball career triples leaders
 List of Major League Baseball single-season triples leaders
 List of Major League Baseball annual runs scored leaders
 List of Major League Baseball annual triples leaders
List of Major League Baseball single-game hits leaders

References
General
Parker, Clifton Blue. Big and Little Poison: Paul and Lloyd Waner, Baseball Brothers. McFarland, 2003. .

Inline

Further reading
 Chadwick, George (June 16, 1927) "Waner Boys Popularizing Saxophone in Major Loop". San Bernardino Sun.  
 "Doing the Brother Act". New York Daily News. October 28, 1927. p. 64
 Sugarman, Elias E. (November 12, 1927). "New Turns and Returns: Paul and Lloyd Waner". Billboard.
 Pacific & Atlantic (February 5, 1928). "Walloping Waners Take to Air". Los Angeles Times.
 Balinger, Edward S. (March 8, 1932). "Pirates of 1932: Lloyd Waner". Pittsburgh Post-Gazette.

External links

Lloyd Waner at The Deadball Era

1906 births
1982 deaths
Baltimore Orioles scouts
Baseball players from Oklahoma
Boston Braves players
Brooklyn Dodgers players
Cincinnati Reds players
Columbia Comers players
Deaths from emphysema
Major League Baseball center fielders
Minor league baseball managers
National Baseball Hall of Fame inductees
National League All-Stars
People from Oklahoma County, Oklahoma
Philadelphia Phillies players
Pittsburgh Pirates players
Pittsburgh Pirates scouts
San Francisco Seals (baseball) players